Cuscuta australis, commonly known as Australian dodder, is a herb in the family Convolvulaceae.

The annual parasitic twining herb or climber that is associated with many hosts. It blooms between November and March producing 5-merous white-cream-yellow flowers
The lobes are rounded-triangular and shorter than or equal in length to the corolla tube. It parasitises both native and exotic plants. To maximize its seed yield, it synchronizes its flowering to that of its host plant via detection of a signaling protein in the host.

Distribution

Australia
In Western Australia, it is found in a small area in the Fitzgerald River National Park in the Great Southern and Goldfields-Esperance regions of Western Australia where it grows in sandy-clay soils.  It is also found in New South Wales, Victoria, Queensland, and New Guinea

Elsewhere
It is found widely throughout the world and considered native to Europe, tropical Asia, Africa, Australasia and temperate Asia.

Taxonomy
C. australis was first described by Robert Brown in 1810.  The type specimen, BM00016305, was collected on 25 September 1802 at Broad Sound, Queensland, Australia by Robert Brown.

References

External links
 AVH: Cuscuta australis occurrence data (Australasian distribution map)
 GBIF: Cuscuta australis (world wide distribution map)

australis
Plants described in 1810
Taxa named by Robert Brown (botanist, born 1773)